The Monte Carlo Classic is a yearly female professional squash tournament in Monte Carlo, Monaco. In its current version, it is part of the PSA World Tour. In recent times it has been held in November or December each year. The prize money is usually $25K, but there have been some exceptions over the years.

Results

See also
 PSA World Tour
 WSA World Tour

References

PSA World Tour
WSA World Tour
Women's squash tournaments
Squash in Monaco